Anthony George Manzo (born 1958) was elected Senator for the Taraba North senatorial district of Taraba State, Nigeria, taking office on 29 May 2007. He is a member of the People's Democratic Party (PDP).

Background

Manzo was born in 1958. He obtained certification as an MBBS and FRCS, becoming a Medical Practitioner.
He was appointed Commissioner of Health, Taraba State and Chairman of the Medical Advisory Committee, Gwagwalada Specialist Hospital.
During the second term of the Obasanjo presidency he was Ambassador of Nigeria to Israel.
From his experience in Israel he concluded that the strength of democratic institutions was more important than that of individual officeholders. 
In January 2005 he was also appointed High Commissioner of Nigeria to Cyprus.

Political career
After assuming his senate seat in 2007 Manzo was appointed to committees on Police Affairs, Information and Media, Health, Foreign Affairs and Air Force.
In a mid-term evaluation of Senators in May 2009, ThisDay noted he had sponsored bills for amendment of the Nigeria Christian Pilgrims Commission Act, Nation Security Enhancement, amendment of the Psychiatric Hospital Management Board Act, University of Abuja College of Medicine, Mental Health, and Free Medical Centres.

In October 2008 Manzo was the sponsor of a motion titled "Global Credit Crisis and its Impact on Nigeria" which was cosponsored by nineteen other senators. The motion criticized the recent bank consolidations under CBN governor Chukwuma Soludo, recommended improvements to bank regulation and supervision, and called on the Federal Government to pay debts owed local contractors and pensioners in order to reduce the credit crunch, among other things.
In an article published in ThisDay in November 2008, Manzo made the case that projects to develop Nigeria were of no value unless the people of the country could return to basic principles of honesty and integrity. Without these the country could never become great.
In August 2009, Manzo defended cross-carpeting, saying it would be undemocratic to prohibit politicians from changing party.

Manzo was a contender to again be PDP candidate for Taraba North in the April 2011 elections, but was defeated in the primaries by Aisha Jummai, who went on to be elected to the Senate.

References

Living people
1958 births
People from Taraba State
Peoples Democratic Party members of the Senate (Nigeria)
21st-century Nigerian politicians